Choe Chol-su (born December 1, 1969) is a North Korean boxer who won the gold medal in the men's Flyweight (51 kg) category at the 1992 Summer Olympics in Barcelona.

Olympic results
 Defeated Moustafa Esmail (Egypt) 7-4
 Defeated Paul Ingle (Great Britain) 13-12
 Defeated Robbie Peden (Australia) 25-11
 Defeated István Kovács (Hungary) 10-5
 Defeated Raúl González (Cuba) 12-2

Ingle, Peden and Kovács all went on to become professional boxing world champions.

See also
 Ku Yong-jo

References

External links
 
 

1969 births
Living people
Flyweight boxers
Boxers at the 1992 Summer Olympics
Olympic gold medalists for North Korea
Olympic boxers of North Korea
Olympic medalists in boxing
Medalists at the 1992 Summer Olympics
Kim Il-sung University alumni
North Korean male boxers
AIBA World Boxing Championships medalists
People from Kaesong